The speaker of the Ethiopian House of Peoples Representatives is the presiding officer over the House. The current speaker is Tagesse Chafo who succeeded Muferiat Kamil when Kamil was promoted to become the minister of peace. 

The inaugural holder of this post was Dawit Yohannes who became speaker in 1995. He left the role in 2005 after serving for 10 years.

List of speakers of the House of Peoples' Representatives

References

Government of Ethiopia